Coelotanypus atus is a species of midge in the family Chironomidae.

References

Further reading

External links

 

Tanypodinae
Insects described in 1971